The EMD GT22CUM1 is a narrow gauge diesel-electric locomotive built by EMD. It has six axles in two trucks, giving it a C-C wheel arrangement. The name means a C-C locomotive, U for metre gauge (the rails are a metre apart), 12-cylinder 645 series. They were built for service in South America by the Villares with license of EMD. The Rede Ferroviaria Federal Sociedade Anonima (RFFSA) a state railroad in Brazil bought about 55 in the early 1980s in order to expand their locomotive roster. The RFFSA needed a powerful single-engined locomotive with light weight per axle for their metric system, and the GT22 represented the highest-rated model that EMD had to offer at the time.

The model name "GT22CUM1" deconstructs as follows:
G - general Use 
T - turbo charged
22 - 12-cylinder 645E diesel engine 
C - C-C wheel arrangement
U - metrical gauge 
M1 - model 1

See also 
EMD GT22CUM-2

External links 
Pictures

G22TCUM-1
C-C locomotives